Jonathan Paul (Jon) Wilks  (born 30 September 1967) is a British diplomat who was the Ambassador to Iraq from 2017 to 2019, Ambassador to Oman from 2014 to 2017 and Ambassador to Yemen from 2010 to 2011.

Career
Wilks was born at Callow End, Worcestershire, and educated at The Chase School, Malvern, and Durham University where he graduated in 1989 with a BSc degree in natural sciences. He was also President of the Durham Union.

After graduation he joined the Foreign and Commonwealth Office (FCO). After Arabic language training in London and Cairo 1991–93 he was posted to Khartoum 1993–96 and Riyadh 1996–99. He then returned to Durham University for a MA in Middle East Politics (2000), then went to St Antony's College, Oxford for a MPhil in International Relations (2002). After six months' secondment at the Cabinet Office, he was deputy head of the team that reopened the British mission in Baghdad after the Iraq War, from April to November 2003. He was deputy head of the Iraq policy unit at the FCO 2004–05 and of the security policy group 2005–07. In 2007 he was appointed the British government's first regional Arabic spokesman, based in Dubai. He was deputy head of mission in Baghdad 2009–10, then Ambassador to Yemen 2010–11. In 2012 he did the 
Higher Command and Staff Course at the Military Staff College, Shrivenham, then was UK Special Representative to the Syrian Opposition 2012–13, UK
Special Representative for Syria 2013–14 and Ambassador to Oman 2014–17.

Wilks was appointed CMG in the 2012 Birthday Honours.

References

1967 births
Living people
Alumni of University College, Durham
Alumni of St Antony's College, Oxford
Ambassadors of the United Kingdom to Yemen
Ambassadors of the United Kingdom to Oman
Ambassadors of the United Kingdom to Iraq
Companions of the Order of St Michael and St George
Presidents of the Durham Union